Greek National Road 4 (abbreviated as EO4) is a single carriageway road in  northern Greece. It connects Kozani with Chalkidona, passing through Veria. 

4
Roads in Western Macedonia
Roads in Central Macedonia